Fernando Núñez may refer to:

 Fernando Núñez de Lara (1173-1129), Spanish count
 Fernando Núñez Sagredo (died 1639), Nicaraguan prelate
 Fernando Núñez (footballer, born 1978), Spanish footballer
 Fernando Núñez (footballer, born 1995), Argentine footballer